Heiligenstock Transmitter, also known as the Heiligenstock Radio Tower, was a wooden German lattice transmitter that was used for mediumwave broadcasting. The tower was built in the year 1934 but was dismantled four years later because of its bad state. The tower was then rebuilt the same year it was dismantled in the city of Frankfurt. The newly rebuilt radio tower was then demolished on March 25, 1945 during the Second World War by the retreating German troops using explosives. It was 107 metres tall.

See also
Utbremen Radio Tower
Stettin Radio Tower
Gustav-Vietor-Tower
Schomberg Observation Tower
Gillerberg Observation Tower
Gross Reken Melchenberg Radio Tower
Poppenberg Observation Tower

References

External links
SkyscraperPage Forum

Towers completed in 1934
Towers completed in 1938
Buildings and structures demolished in 1938
Buildings and structures demolished in 1945
Communication towers in Germany
1934 establishments in Germany
1945 disestablishments in Germany